The South American Cricket Championship (Spanish: Campeonato Sudamericano de Críquet; Portuguese:
Campeonato Sul-Americano de Críquete) is an international limited-overs cricket tournament featuring national teams from South America and other invited national sides from outside South America, currently played annually but until 2013 was usually played every two years. The first men's event was held in 1995 and a women's tournament started in 2007. The two tournaments have been played simultaneously or back-to-back since 2013. 

Argentine teams have been the most successful at the men's tournament, winning on eleven occasions. The Argentine national team won the first three championships without losing a game, and subsequently the country was represented by a development squad, Argentina A, between 2000 and 2018. Guyana, the only Test-playing country in South America (as part of the West Indies cricket team), had sent a team four times, winning twice, but this has generally been a "masters" team consisting of past players. Colombia were going to send a team to the 2000 tournament, but in fact did not debut until 2015. The non-South American teams invited to the tournament have been Panama (in 2000), Puerto Rico (in 2004), Costa Rica (in 2018) and Mexico (since 2014). The thirteenth edition of the tournament was held in Itaguaí, Rio de Janeiro State, Brazil, in October 2016. Chile won the men's tournament and Brazil won the women's tournament.
The 2018 Championships were awarded to Colombia for the first time, and took place over 4 days in August with Mexico emerging as champions for the second time. Mexico won the men's event for the second time in 2018, and Argentina won again in 2019.

Argentina also dominated the women's event by winning on seven occasions. From 2018, all women's matches between ICC member nations would be eligible for Twenty20 International (T20I) status after the ICC decided to grant T20I status to all matches involving its members from 1 January 2019. Brazil's women won the first edition with this enhanced status. Starting from the 2019 edition, the same status would apply to the men's event. The only non-ICC playing nations in 2019 were Colombia and Uruguay.

Results (Men's)

Performance by team (Men's)
Legend
 – Champions
 – Runners-up
 – Third place
GS – Group stage
Q – Qualified
 — Hosts

Performance by team (Women's)
Legend
 – Champions
 – Runners-up
 – Third place
P – Participated, position not known
T – Participated, but games not counted towards the South American Championship
 — Hosts

Notes

References

South American Cricket Championship

International cricket competitions
Twenty20 International cricket competitions